Telephone numbers in Georgia may refer to:

Telephone numbers in Georgia (U.S. state)
Telephone numbers in Georgia (country)